General Thomas Rowland Morgan (born January 6, 1930) served as Assistant Commandant of the United States Marine Corps from June 1986 until he retired on July 1, 1988, after completion of more than 36 years of active service.

Biography
Thomas R. Morgan was born on January 6, 1930, in Allentown, Pennsylvania. He completed high school in Slatington, Pennsylvania, in 1948.  Morgan graduated from Colgate University in Hamilton, New York, earning a Bachelor of Arts degree in history and political science in 1952. He was a member of Sigma Chi fraternity. He also holds a Master of Arts degree in counselor education from the University of Virginia, Charlottesville, Virginia (June 1973).  Morgan was commissioned a Marine Corps second lieutenant on June 6, 1952, and entered The Basic School, Quantico, Virginia. Following Basic School, he was ordered to flight training at Naval Air Station Pensacola, Florida, and was designated a Naval Aviator in August 1954. Ordered to MCAS El Toro, California, he served as Assistant Maintenance Officer of Marine Night Fighter Squadron 542, Marine Aircraft Group 15, 3rd Marine Aircraft Wing, El Toro.

In July 1955, he was ordered to the 1st Marine Aircraft Wing in the Western Pacific and served as Personnel Officer of Marine Night Fighter Squadron 513, Marine Aircraft Group 11, and subsequently as aide-de-camp to the commanding general of the wing. He was promoted to captain in August 1955. He returned to Hawaii for duty as aide to the deputy commander, Fleet Marine Force (FMF), Pacific from July 1956 to July 1957 and was then assigned as assistant operations officer of Marine Attack Squadron 214, Marine Aircraft Group 13, at Marine Corps Air Station, Kaneohe Bay.

General Morgan was ordered to NAS Olathe, Kansas, in January 1959 as a flight instructor in the Navy's Jet Transitional Training Unit. When the unit was disestablished in October 1959, he reported for duty to Marine Aircraft Group 32, at Marine Corps Air Station, Beaufort, South Carolina. He served as personnel officer and Aircraft Maintenance Officer of Marine Fighter Squadron 333 until November 1961. Ordered to WestPac, he served as executive officer, Headquarters and Maintenance Squadron 11, Marine Aircraft Group 11, NAS Atsugi, Japan until January 1962.

From January 1962 to July 1965, he served as the fleet liaison officer at Marine Corps Air Station, Yuma, Arizona, coordinating aviation weapons training. He was promoted to major in July 1963. Reassigned to Quantico, he entered the Command and Staff College, completing the course in June 1966. Morgan was ordered to Marine Aircraft Group 32, 2nd Marine Aircraft Wing at MCAS Beaufort, South Carolina in July 1966, where he served as group operations officer and later as commanding officer, Marine Fighter Attack Squadron 312. He was promoted to lieutenant colonel in July 1967. In August 1968, he reported to Marine Aircraft Group 13 at Chu Lai, serving as group operations officer and then as officer-in-charge of the DaNang DASC in Vietnam.

He returned to the United States in September 1969 and was assigned as executive officer of Marine Corps Air Station, Quantico, and later as G-3 Marine Corps Base. From July 1971 until July 1973, he was assigned to the Naval Reserve Officer Training Corps Unit at the University of Virginia, where he served as executive officer.

Promoted to colonel in July 1973, General Morgan was ordered to the U.S. European Command Headquarters in Stuttgart, Germany, where he served as the chief of War Plans Branch, J-5. He remained in that position until he was assigned duty as assistant deputy chief of staff for requirements and programs, Headquarters Marine Corps, Washington, D.C. While serving in this capacity, he was selected in February 1977 for promotion to brigadier general. He was promoted to brigadier general on March 18, 1977, and assumed duty as assistant division commander, 3rd Marine Division, on Okinawa, Japan from April 1977 to April 1978. On June 17, 1978, he was assigned as the assistant chief of staff (C-5) of the Combined Forces Command, Seoul, Korea. He served in this capacity until assuming duty as deputy commander, FMF, Pacific, Camp H. M. Smith, Hawaii, in July 1980.

On May 1, 1981, Morgan was promoted to major general with date of rank of August 1, 1977. He was assigned duty as the deputy chief of staff for requirements and programs, Headquarters Marine Corps, on May 26, 1981. On June 13, 1985, he was advanced to lieutenant general and assumed the duty as deputy chief of staff for plans, policies and operations. He was assigned additional duties as acting chief of staff on November 16, 1985.

General Morgan was nominated by the president to the grade of general and assignment as Assistant Commandant of the Marine Corps in March 1986. Upon advancement to general on June 1, 1986, he assumed his final assignment.  He retired on July 1, 1988, after completion of more than 36 years of active service.

Awards and decorations
General Morgan's personal awards and decorations include:

See also

List of United States Marine Corps four-star generals

References

1930 births
Living people
Assistant Commandants of the United States Marine Corps
Colgate University alumni
Military personnel from Allentown, Pennsylvania
Recipients of the Legion of Merit
Northern Lehigh High School alumni
Recipients of the Air Medal
Recipients of the Defense Superior Service Medal
United States Marine Corps generals
United States Naval Aviators
University of Virginia alumni